Slide Rule is the sixth solo album by dobro player Jerry Douglas, released in 1992 (see 1992 in music). It was his first release on the Sugar Hill label.

Guest musicians include Alison Krauss, Sam Bush and Tim O'Brien.

Track listing
 "Ride the Wild Turkey" (Darol Anger) – 3:10
 "Pearlie Mae" (Eddie Lynn Snodderly) – 3:29
 "When Papa Played the Dobro" (Johnny Cash) – 2:26
 "We Hide & Seek" (Jerry Douglas) – 6:29
 "I Don't Believe You've Met My Baby" (Autry Inman) – 3:10
 "Shoulder to Shoulder" (Douglas, Mark Schatz) – 2:41
 "Uncle Sam" (Douglas) – 0:38
 "It's a Beautiful Life" (E. Ehm, T. Thorny) – 3:56
 "Rain on Oliviatown" (Douglas) – 2:04
 "Hey Joe" (Billy Roberts) – 3:07
 "A New Day Medley" (Douglas) – 5:46
 "Shenandoah Breakdown" (Bill Monroe) – 3:12

Personnel
Jerry Douglas – dobro
Sam Bush – mandolin
Stuart Duncan – fiddle
Alison Krauss – vocals
Alan O'Bryant – vocals
Maura O'Connell – vocals
Eddie Lynn Snodderly – vocals
Eugene Wolf – vocals
Scott Nygaard – guitar
Russ Barenberg – guitar
 Arty McGlynn – guitar
Tim O'Brien – mandolin, vocals
Mark Schatz – bass
Craig Smith – banjo
Adam Steffey – mandolin

1992 albums
Jerry Douglas albums
Sugar Hill Records albums